John VIII (died 7 October 1571) served as an archbishop of Antivari in the mid-16th century.

Originally from Ulcinj (present-day Montenegro), from the Albanian Bruni family. Pope Julius II appointed John as Archbishop of Antivari (Bar) in 1551 because of his rare virtues and executive abilities.

Archbishop John VIII (Giovanni Bruni) participated in the Council of Trent between 1551 and 1552, and between 1562 and 1563, at which sessions he spoke with distinction. He was the fiercest opponent of the surrender of the city of Bar to the Turks. However, the Venetian governor of Bar, Count Alessandro Donato, and the Venetian military commander Giovanni Guidaccioni, decided that surrender was unavoidable. One source claims that they had sent the Archbishop and 600 soldiers on a galley to Ali Pasha (Ali Müezzinzade Pasha), the admiral of the besieging Ottoman fleet, who offered to purchase the Archbishop for 25,000 Venetian sequins; but any such offer was never finalised.  Like many other people from Bar and Ulcinj whom the Ottoman forces had captured when those cities fell to their attacks and were surrendered to them in August 1571, the Archbishop was one of the slaves who rowed in an Ottoman galley at the Battle of Lepanto on 7 October.

On 7 October 1571, during the Battle of Lepanto, some sources claim that the Turks had Archbishop John VIII (Giovanni Bruni) decapitated. Another source states that Christians executed him, mistaking him for a Turk.

References

1571 deaths
People from Ulcinj
Archbishops of Antivari
Year of birth unknown
Albanian Roman Catholics